The 2022 Istanbul Challenger was a professional tennis tournament played on hard courts. It was the 36th edition of the tournament which was part of the 2022 ATP Challenger Tour. It took place in Istanbul, Turkey between 12 and 18 September 2022.

Singles main-draw entrants

Seeds

 1 Rankings are as of 30 August 2022.

Other entrants
The following players received wildcards into the singles main draw: 
  Berk İlkel
  Koray Kırcı
  Aleksandre Metreveli

The following players received entry from the qualifying draw:
  Sarp Ağabigün
  Cengiz Aksu
  Térence Atmane
  Marek Gengel
  Dominik Palán
  Beibit Zhukayev

The following player received entry as a lucky loser:
  Bogdan Ionuț Apostol

Champions

Singles

  Radu Albot def.  Lukáš Rosol 6–2, 6–0.

Doubles

  Purav Raja /  Divij Sharan def.  Arjun Kadhe /  Fernando Romboli 6–4, 3–6, [10–8].

References

2022 ATP Challenger Tour
2022
2022 in Turkish tennis
September 2022 sports events in Europe